Andrei Prii (5 October 1938 – 25 December 2022) was an Estonian economist and politician.

Prii died on 25 December 2022 at the age of 84.

References

Estonian politicians
1938 births
2022 deaths
Members of the Supreme Soviet of the Estonian Soviet Socialist Republic
Tallinn University of Technology alumni
Estonian economists
People from Muhu Parish